Pesukei dezimra ( pǝsûqê ḏǝzimrāʾ "Verses of praise"; Rabbinic Hebrew:  pasûqê hazzǝmîrôṯ "Verses of songs), or zemirot as they are called in the Spanish and Portuguese tradition, are a group of prayers that may be recited during Shacharit (the morning set of prayers in Judaism). They consist of various blessings, psalms, and sequences of other Biblical verses. Historically, reciting pesukei dezimra in morning prayer was a practice of only the especially pious. Over the course of Jewish history, their recitation has become widespread custom among all of the various rites of Jewish prayer.

The goal of pesukei dezimra is for the individual to recite praises of God before making the requests featured later in Shacharit and the day.

Origin
The first source for pesukei dezimra is in the Babylonian Talmud, where it is described as non-obligatory (performed by some people but not others):

Later commentaries explain what pesukei dezimra consists of: Rashi said it means psalms 148 and 150, Saadia Gaon said it means psalms 145, 148, 149, 150, while Menachem Meiri and Maimonides said it means all of psalms 145-150. Nowadays, it is customary for pesukei dezimra to include psalms 145-150 as well as several other psalms, recitations, and blessings before (Barukh she'amar) and after (Yishtabach) pesukei dezimra.

Elsewhere, the Talmud states that a person should praise God first and only afterwards begin their prayer. Opinions differ as to which praise is referred to: the first three blessings of the Amidah, the Shema blessings, or to pesukei dezimra.

For a long time, these prayers remained optional. Eventually, pesukei dezimra were incorporated into all standard Jewish prayer services. Maimonides taught that prayer should be recited in an upbeat mood, slowly, and wholeheartedly, and that rushing through them (as many who recite them daily do) defeats their purpose.

Rashi commented Talmud Berakhot 4b that "Three times" is prayer that is psalm 145 is personal Jewish prayer what is said three times a day. Rashi considered that singing of three psalms 145, 148, 150 in the morning is Jewish personal prayer (not communal). Maimonides considered the same, that communal prayer begins just starting from Kaddish and Shema.

Order

Ashkenazi
 Psalm 30 (an addition in the 18th century, adopted in the Eastern Ashkenazic rite, but not in the Western Ashkenazic rite or by those who follow the practices of the Vilna Gaon)
 Barukh she'amar
 Songs of thanksgiving
 Psalm 100 (omitted on Shabbat, Yom Tov, Erev Yom Kippur, Erev Passover, and Chol HaMoed Passover)
 The following psalms are recited on Shabbat and Yom Tov only, and - in the Eastern Ashkenazic rite - also on Hoshana Rabbah: 19, 34, 90, 91, 135, 136, 33, 92, and 93
 Yehi kevod
 Hallel (pesukei dezimra) (Ashrei and psalms 145-150)
 Baruch Hashem L'Olam
 Vayivarech David
 Ata Hu Hashem L'Vadecha
 Az Yashir
 Nishmat (Shabbat and Yom Tov only)
 Shochein Ad (Shabbat and Yom Tov only)
 Yishtabach

Sephardi/Mizrahi
 Songs of thanksgiving
Psalm 30
 The following psalms are recited on Shabbat, and Yom Tov only: 19, 33, 90, 91, 98
 On Yom Tov, the psalm for each holiday is recited: On Passover, 107; On Shavuot, 68; on Sukkot, 42 and 43; on Shemini Atzeret, 12
 The following psalms are recited on Shabbat, and Yom Tov only: 121, 122, 123, 124, 135, 136,
 Barukh she'amar
 92 and 93 (recited on Shabbat, and Yom Tov only)
 Psalm 100 (recited on Erev Yom Kippur and Erev Passover, omitted on Shabbat and Yom Tov)
 Yehi Kivod
 Hallel (pesukei dezimra) (Ashrei and psalms 145-150)
 Baruch Hashem L'Olam
 Vayivarech David
 Ata Hu Hashem L'Vadecha
 Az Yashir
 Nishmat (Shabbat and Yom Tov only)
 Shav'at Aniyim (Shabbat and Yom Tov only)
 Yishtabach

Shabbat/Yom Tov additions

On Shabbat, holidays of biblical origin, and - in the Eastern Ashkenazic rite also on Hoshana Rabbah - various psalms are added between Hodu and Yehi Khevod. The reason for additions is that no one has to rush off to work on these days, thereby allowing extra time for praise.

Ashkenazi Judaism includes the following psalms in the following order: 19, 33, 34, 90, 91, 135, 136, 92, and 93.

Sephardic Judaism includes the following psalms in the following order: 103, 19, 33, 90, 91, 98, 121, 122, 123, 124, 135, 136, 92, and 93.

On Shabbat and Yom Tov, Nishmat is inserted between the Song of the sea and the closing blessing; according to many, it is in fact an expanded version of the concluding blessing.

Following Nishmat, Shochein Ad is inserted. On Shabbat, the hazzan for Shacharit begins recitation of Shochein Ad (technically speaking, it is not necessary to have a hazzan for Pesukei Dezimra at all). On the Three Pilgrimage Festivals, there are a variety of customs: According to the Eastern Ashkenazic rite, the hazzan begins the service on the previous verse known as Hakel B'tzatzumot on each of the Pilgrimage Festivals, signifying miracles God performed associated with these three holidays.  According to the Western Ashkenazic rite, the hazzan begins ha-gibur la-nezach on Passover, Hakel B'tzatzumot on Shavuot and ha-gadol bi-khvot shemecha on Sukkot. On the High Holy Days, the hazzan begins on the word Hamelekh within that verse, as during these days, an emphasis is placed on recognition of God as King. It is also described in the Book of Life that loudly chanting the word Hamelekh has the effect of driving away accusers from the throne of judgement. Additionally, the letter  is dropped off the word , alluding to the fact that now God is sitting on the throne.

Recitation by women
There is an argument among Orthodox rabbis as to whether women are required or even permitted to recite pesukei dezimra, given that it is considered by some to be a timebound commandment. The opinions either require women to recite it completely, prohibit the recitation of Barukh She'amar and Yishtabach among women, or allow but not require its recitation.

Ashkenazi Judaism considers pesukei dezimra to be an obligation on the basis that it is not timebound, and it can be recited at any time of day.

Opinions in Sephardic Judaism are divided. Some opinions allow women to recite pesukei dezimra without its accompanying blessings.

Notes

References

External links
 Pesukei D'Zmira explainer video at BimBam.com
 Pesukei d’Zimrah HaRav Eliezer Melamed

 
Aramaic words and phrases
Aramaic words and phrases in Jewish prayers and blessings
Shacharit